Center City High School was an accredited alternative high school located in Escondido, California, part of the Escondido Union High School District. Center City's mode of instruction was independent study, which is an instructional strategy that responds to students' needs and styles of learning. The school closed in 2009 and was replaced by independent learning centers at the district's other high schools (Escondido, Orange Glen and San Pasqual).

See also
Escondido Union High School District

References

External links
 Escondido Unified High School District

High schools in San Diego County, California
Educational institutions disestablished in 2009
Educational institutions established in 1989
Defunct schools in California
Education in Escondido, California
1989 establishments in California
2009 disestablishments in California